Armeena Rana Khan is a Pakistani Canadian film and television actress and model. One of Pakistan's most popular actresses, she has received a Lux Style Award, a Hum Award and a Nigar Award nomination. Most of her television series in which she has starred were highly successful, establishing Khan in the Urdu entertainment industry. In 2016, Eastern Eye named her among  the "50 Sexiest Asian Women" and the following year, she was awarded the Women Empowerment Award by the Pakistan Achievement Awards.

Khan, born in Toronto to Pakistan parents, was raised in Manchester and earned a master's degree in Business Administration from the University of Manchester. Khan worked as a model for a few months and later made her acting debut with the British short film Writhe, which was screened at the Cannes Film Festival, making her the first actress from Pakistan to attend the festival. She rose to prominence with the role of an antagonist in the romantic television series Muhabbat Ab Nahi Hugi (2014), garnering her a Best Villain nomination at Hum Awards. She followed it by garnering widespread critical acclaim for her starring roles in the romantic series— Ishq Parast (2015) and Karb (2015). In 2015 and 2016, she played a girl next door in the film and television adaption of the novel Bin Roye Ansoo, the former earned her a nominations for the Lux Style Award for Best Supporting Actress. She established herself in Urdu cinema by starring as the female lead in the romantic comedy Janaan and the war drama Yalghaar, both of which rank among of the highest-grossing Pakistani films of all time. Khan subsequently received unanimous praise for portraying a woman caught in a romantic triangle in the romantic television series Rasm E Duniya (2017) and a troubled wife in Hum TV-produced social drama Daldal (2017).

, she plays Tara in the Hum TV series, Mohabbatein Chahatein.

Early life and background
Khan was born in Toronto, Ontario, to Pakistani parents. Her father is a businessman, and her mother is a homemaker. She has two sisters, one elder and a younger. Khan is of Pashtun and Punjabi origins. Khan did her schooling from Toronto, however, the family later relocated to Manchester, where she attended the University of Manchester, earning an Honors degree in Business Administration. She later studied method acting at the Ealing Studios and the Pinewood Studios. According to the actress, she holds dual citizenship of Pakistan and Canada. Khan is fluent in English and Urdu and can read Arabic.

Khan pursued modelling in 2010 before becoming an actress. During this time, she worked for various brands and products, including Nishat Linen, Faysal Bank and Sprite. She established herself as a well-known model in Pakistan and Britain and soon began receiving offers for film roles.

Acting career  
Khan's first acting role was for the British short film "Writhe", in which Khan played the role of a serial killer. The film was selected for the 2013 Cannes Film Festival. Khan claimed that she was the first Pakistani actress to walk at Cannes in 2013. She then appeared in another short film, titled Stranger Within Me which was screened at the 2014 Cannes Film Festival. Khan starred alongside Azfar Rehman in the sitcom Happily Married which aired in 2013 on ARY Digital. The year 2013, also witnessed the broadcasting of Khan's first serious acting performances with the airing of Shab-e-Arzu ka Alam, in which she plays the lead role alongside Mohib Mirza. But it was the television series Muhabbat Ab Nahi Hugi that proved to be a breakthrough for her,  and for which she was also nominated for Hum Awards 2015. She then moved on to continue with other TV serials Ishq Parast and Karb playing the lead role alongside Adnan Siddiqui. Khan made her Bollywood debut in 2013 with Huff! It's Too Much with a lead role in the film.

Khan became a well-known actress in the country with the 2015 romantic drama film Bin Roye as the lead cast along with Mahira Khan and Humayun Saeed, and was later turned into a drama serial with the same name. Produced by Momina Duraid, the film and the television version were based on the novel Bin Roye Aansu by Farhat Ishtiaq. That same year, she featured alongside Osman Khalid Butt in the music video "Sajna". Sung by Uzair Jaswal and produced by his brother Yasir Jaswal, the single was well received upon release and earned her nationwide recognition. Her other big screen projects include the epic-war drama Yalghaar, a film by Hassan Waqas Rana which is being termed as the most expensive movie in the history of Pakistani cinema, and Janaan, a romantic comedy which is directed by Azfar Jafri and Co produced by Hareem Farooq, Reham Khan and Imran Raza Kazmi. In November 2016, she was signed for Rasm E Duniya, a television drama that aired on ARY Digital. In 2019, Khan played the leading role in the patriotic war film Sherdil.

Personal life 
Khan announced her engagement to British Pakistani businessman Fesyl Khan on Twitter in July 2017. She revealed that Fesyl had proposed to her on the beach in Cuba. Khan married Fesyl in a Nikah ceremony in London on 14 February 2020.

Filmography

Film

Television

References

External links

Living people
Actresses from Toronto
Canadian film actresses
Canadian female models
Canadian actresses of Pakistani descent
Canadian people of Pashtun descent
Canadian people of Punjabi descent
Pakistani film actresses
Pakistani female models
Actresses in Urdu cinema
Actresses in Hindi cinema
Canadian expatriate actresses in India
Pakistani expatriate actresses in India
Pashtun women
Punjabi people
Canadian expatriate actresses in the United Kingdom
Alumni of the University of Manchester
Year of birth missing (living people)
21st-century Canadian actresses
21st-century Pakistani actresses